Ińsko  (formerly ) is a town in Stargard County, West Pomeranian Voivodeship, Poland.  It has a population of 1,980 (2016).

Ińsko gives its name to the protected area known as Ińsko Landscape Park.

Cities and towns in West Pomeranian Voivodeship
Stargard County